Loch of Drumellie also known as Marlee Loch or Loch of Marlee is a small lowland freshwater loch that is located 2.3 miles west of Blairgowrie, in  Perth and Kinross The loch is also a designated Site of Special Scientific Interest (SSSI), as well as forming part of a Special Area of Conservation.

References

Drumellie
Drumellie
Tay catchment
Protected areas of Perth and Kinross
Sites of Special Scientific Interest in Scotland
Conservation in the United Kingdom
Special Areas of Conservation in Scotland
Birdwatching sites in Scotland